Eritrea may refer to:
 Eritrea, the modern African state
 Eritrea (opera), by Francesco Cavalli
 Eritrea (colonial ship), Italian warship
 Eretria, the Greek city

See also
 Eritrean (disambiguation)